Notable people, past and present, who were born in, residents of, or otherwise closely associated with Mobile, Alabama:

Literature
Manda Collins, historical romance author
Augusta Jane Evans, author
Winston Groom, author, best known for Forrest Gump   
Melinda Haynes, author
Roy Hoffman, author
Michael Knight, university professor and author
William March, author and World War I veteran
William P. McGivern, author
Albert Murray, Author
 John Travis Nixon, newspaper publisher in Monroe and Crowley, Louisiana; formerly worked as a journalist in Mobile; died in Mobile in 1909
Michelle Richmond, author
Emma Langdon Roche, author and artist
Stanley R. Tiner, journalist for Mobile Press-Register and The Sun Herald in Biloxi-Gulfport, Mississippi; Tiner and staff won 2006 Pulitzer Prize for Hurricane Katrina coverage.

Arts and entertainment
Yolande Betbeze, Miss America 1951
Bob Holly, professional wrestler known as "Hardcore Holly"
Bill Moody, professional wrestling manager known as Percy Pringle and Paul Bearer
Kathryn Morgan, ballet dancer
Geoff Ramsey, co-founder of Rooster Teeth
John Augustus Walker, artist known for his paintings and murals
Eugene Walter, labeled "Mobile's Renaissance Man" for diverse activities the arts; interred in 1998 in historic Church Street Graveyard by special resolution of the city

Business
Tim Cook, CEO of Apple Inc.
James M. Fail, chairman of Bluebonnet Savings Bank
Lonnie Johnson, inventor of the Super Soaker
Geoffrey Sauer, web publisher, theorist, and author

Film and television
Laverne Cox, actress and producer
Phil Gordon, actor and dialect coach
Connie Bea Hope, television personality
Orlando Jones, comedian and actor
Danny Lipford, contractor and TV host
Jonathan Mangum, host, Let's Make a Deal
Fayard Nicholas, dancer of the Nicholas Brothers
Dan Povenmire, television director, television writer, and producer
James "JT" Thomas Jr., million-dollar winner of Survivor: Tocantins
Richard Tyson, film actor

Historic
Joseph Stillwell Cain, Jr., largely credited with the rebirth of Mardi Gras celebrations in Mobile after the Civil War; city celebrates Joe Cain Day on the Sunday before Mardi Gras  
Octavia Walton Le Vert, socialite and writer
Cudjoe Lewis, last adult survivor of the Atlantic Slave Trade
 Eugenie Marx, first president of Mobile Equal Suffrage Association, lived on Government Street 1910-1915
Florence Chandler Maybrick, born into a wealthy Mobile family, her mother remarried after her father's death and became Baroness von Roques; Florence married a British cotton factor, James Maybrick, and they lived at Battlecrease House in Aigburth, a suburb of Liverpool; both were known for their extramarital affairs; Florence was later found guilty of murdering her husband
Alva Erskine Smith Vanderbilt, born and raised in Mobile, wife of Cornelius Vanderbilt's grandson William K. Vanderbilt and mother of Consuelo Spencer-Churchill, Duchess of Marlborough; known for building several of the most noted houses of the Gilded Era; later a crusader for the women's suffrage movement and the Equal Rights Amendment
Michael Donald, lynching victim
Joseph Paul Franklin, serial killer

Military
Lloyd Austin, 28th United States Secretary of Defense
Jerome Gary Cooper, Major General, US Marines 
Keith L. Craig, Sergeant Major, US Army
Jeremiah Denton, admiral, United States Navy
William Crawford Gorgas, physician and 22nd Surgeon General of the United States Army; known for his work in abating the transmission of yellow fever and malaria
John D. New, United States Marine in World War II, only Mobile native to be awarded the Medal of Honor; Cottage Hill Park was renamed Medal of Honor Park in his honor, and Pixie Street was renamed PFC John D. New Drive
Sidney Phillips, United States Marine, portrayed by Ashton Holmes in the HBO miniseries The Pacific
Admiral Raphael Semmes, captain of the CSS Alabama during the American Civil War; resident of Mobile; the Mobile suburb of Semmes is named in his honor  
Eugene Sledge, United States Marine Corps, author of New York Times bestselling book With the Old Breed, portrayed by Joseph Mazzello in the HBO miniseries The Pacific, university professor, and World War II veteran
Leighton W. Smith, Jr., admiral, U.S. Navy; in 1994, became commander-in-chief of U.S. Naval Forces Europe and Allied Forces Southern Europe

Music
Backwater, late 1970s jazz fusion band
The Band Perry, sibling country music trio
Billy Bang, jazz violinist and composer
Jimmy Buffett, vocalist, songwriter and entrepreneur  
Vice Cooler, lead vocalist and songwriter for XBXRX
Elley Duhé, singer and songwriter
James Reese Europe, conductor and composer
Flo Milli, hip hop artist, rapper
Urban Clifford "Urbie" Green, professional jazz trombonist
Jimmy Hall, lead vocalist and harmonica player for Wet Willie
Walker Hayes, country singer
Will Kimbrough, vocalist, songwriter, musician and producer
Allison Moorer, Oscar-nominated songwriter
NoCap, hip hop artist,singer rapper
Bernard Odum, bass player, best known for performing in James Brown's band
Terrance Quaites, aka TQ, R&B artist
Rich Boy, rap and hip hop artist
Ray Sawyer, lead vocalist of Dr. Hook & The Medicine Show
Beverly Jo Scott, singer and songwriter
John "Jabo" Starks, funk and rhythm and blues drummer
Ward Swingle, jazz vocalist
Fred Wesley, jazz and funk trombonist
Cootie Williams, jazz and rhythm and blues trumpeter, performed with Duke Ellington and Benny Goodman
Linda Zoghby, soprano, Metropolitan Opera

Political
 Bidwell Adam, Lieutenant Governor of Mississippi from 1928 to 1932, born in Mobile in 1894; raised in Pass Christian, Mississippi
 Ann Bedsole, member of Alabama House of Representatives 1979–1983 and Alabama State Senate 1983–1995; candidate for governor 1995 and for mayor of Mobile, 2005
Jo Bonner, former U.S. Representative from Alabama's 1st congressional district
Frank Boykin, represented Mobile in Congress for 28 years
Sanford Bishop, Democratic Party, member of the United States House of Representatives
Mark E. Clayton, Democratic nominee for U.S. Senate from Tennessee in 2012; born in Mobile
Margaret Conditt, Ohio State Representative, a Republican member; born in Mobile 
Mike Dow, four-term mayor of Mobile
Vivian Davis Figures, Democratic member of the Alabama State Senate
Alexis Herman, Democratic Party, served as the 23rd U.S. Secretary of Labor under President Bill Clinton
Ethan Allen Hitchcock, U.S. minister to Russia under President William McKinley, U.S. Secretary of the Interior under President Theodore Roosevelt
Samuel L. Jones, Democratic Party, elected as in 2005 as Mobile's first African American mayor
Sybil I. McLaughlin, first Clerk and Speaker in the Cayman Islands government
Joseph C. Mitchell, Democrat member of Alabama House of Representatives from District 103
Bert Nettles, Republican former member of the Alabama House of Representatives from Mobile; subsequently a lawyer in Birmingham
William Holcombe "Bill" Pryor, Jr., Republican Party, former Attorney General of Alabama; federal judge on the United States Court of Appeals for the Eleventh Circuit
Jeff Sessions, Republican Party, formerly Attorney General of Alabama; United States Senator
Donald Eugene Siegelman, Democratic Party, only person in Alabama history elected to serve in all four top statewide offices: Secretary of State, Attorney General, Lieutenant Governor and Governor
Tom Turnipseed, executive director of George Wallace's 1968 presidential campaign who became a liberal activist in South Carolina, born in Mobile

Religious
Oscar Hugh Lipscomb, first Archbishop of Mobile (Roman Catholic) and its eighth bishop
Dominic Manucy, third Bishop of Mobile
Michael Portier, first Bishop of Mobile
Abram Joseph Ryan, poet, Roman Catholic priest at St. Mary's parish; known as  "Poet-priest of the South"
Thomas Joseph Toolen, sixth Bishop of Mobile

Athletics

Mobile is the birthplace of five members of the Baseball Hall of Fame. Only New York City and Chicago can claim to be the birthplace of more members of the Hall.
Hank Aaron, member of the Baseball Hall of Fame and 2nd on the all-time home run list;   Hank Aaron Stadium and the Hank Aaron Loop in Mobile are named in his honor
Tommie Aaron, Major League Baseball player
Bill Adair, Major League Baseball and manager
Terry Adams, Major League Baseball player
Willie Anderson, offensive lineman for Cincinnati Bengals
Frank Bolling, Major League Baseball player
Scott Bolton, wide receiver, Green Bay Packers
Robert Brazile, NFL player
Jason Caffey, Chicago Bulls, NBA
DeMarcus Cousins, NBA player for Sacramento Kings
Dameyune Craig, quarterback for Auburn University and Carolina Panthers; assistant coach for Auburn
Fennis Dembo, forward, played for the NBA world champion Detroit Pistons in 1989
Nick Fairley, defensive tackle for Detroit Lions
Cale Gale, NASCAR driver for KHI
Paul Harris, player for Tampa Bay Buccaneers and Minnesota Vikings
Margaret Holgerson, All-American Girls Professional Baseball League player
Destin Hood, MLB player for the Miami Marlins
Pat Howell, MLB player
Scott Hunter, NFL player
Chevis Jackson, NFL defensive back, Atlanta Falcons, alumnus of LSU
Aron Jóhannsson, American footballer, SV Werder Bremen and United States men's national soccer team
Cleon Jones, MLB outfielder, New York Mets
Antonio Lang, Duke and NBA player
Tamaurice "Tee" Martin, University of Tennessee, NFL and CFL quarterback; led Tennessee to undefeated season (13–0) and 1998 National Championship
Keith McCants, NFL, defensive lineman, Tampa Bay Buccaneers
A. J. McCarron, quarterback for Alabama
Willie McCovey, member of the Baseball Hall of Fame
Henry Monroe, NFL defensive back, Green Bay Packers and Philadelphia Eagles
Sterling Moore, NFL cornerback
Amos Otis, MLB player
Satchel Paige, baseball pitcher, member of the Baseball Hall of Fame; Satchel Paige Drive in Mobile is named in his honor
Jake Peavy, baseball pitcher, winner of Cy Young Award
Juan Pierre, MLB player
Donald Reese, NFL player, Miami Dolphins and New Orleans Saints
JaMarcus Russell, quarterback for LSU and Oakland Raiders
Chris Samuels, NFL lineman, Washington Redskins
Ozzie Smith, MLB shortstop, member of Baseball Hall of Fame
Dewarick Spencer, basketball player for European professional teams
Jaquiski Tartt, NFL safety for the San Francisco 49ers
Erick Walder, track-and-field long jumper
Jimmie Ward, NFL cornerback for the San Francisco 49ers
Turner Ward, MLB baseball player
Billy Williams, MLB left fielder, coach, member of Baseball Hall of Fame
Sherman Williams, NFL
T. J. Yeldon, Jacksonville, Jaguars, NFL
Bubba Wallace, NASCAR driver for 23XI Racing

Science
Gregory Benford, physicist, science fiction author
Regina Benjamin, physician, medical director, former Surgeon General of the United States 
Kathryn P. Hire, captain, United States Naval Reserve, NASA astronaut
George Bigelow Rogers, architect
Alfreda Johnson Webb, professor of biology and doctor of veterinary medicine

/

References

Mobile, Alabama
Mobile